Coverly is a rural unincorporated community in northeastern Amelia County in the U.S. state of Virginia. The town is located on SR 631 (Coverly Road) off SR 604 (Chula Road) at Coverly, a farm and historic home built in the 1830s, atop a hill with the Appomattox River to the east, Flat Creek to the south, and the Norfolk Southern Railway to the northwest. The railroad, originally the Richmond and Danville, crosses Route 631 between the village and Route 604. The community of Chula lies 2 miles southwest, and Mattoax and Masons Corner approximately 2 miles north. The area is served by the post office at Amelia Court House, the county seat, 8 miles southwest of Coverly, and by the volunteer fire department at Mattoax.

During the Civil War, cavalry led by Union general August Kautz conducted raids against the Richmond and Danville Railroad in 1864. Confederate defenders clashed with Kautz's forces at Flat Creek Bridge, less than a mile west of the area later called Coverly, on May 14.

Coverly Farm, established around 1835, continues to operate, offering tours, hiking, a seasonal pumpkin patch, local food, and wood products.

References

External links
 Coverly Farm

Unincorporated communities in Virginia
Unincorporated communities in Amelia County, Virginia